Gcal may refer to:
Google Calendar, a free calendaring Web application
Gigacalorie, referred to as a ton of TNT for thermochemical reactions

GCAL may refer to:
Greater Cincinnati Academic League, a high school quiz bowl league